Cantol Wax Company Building, also known as Oakes Manufacturing Company Building and Wylie's Furniture Warehouse, is a historic industrial / commercial building located at Bloomington, Monroe County, Indiana.  It was built between about 1905 and 1907, and consists of a -story, rectangular, front section, and -story rear addition.  The masonry building has a rubble limestone foundation, terra cotta block walls, and Classical Revival style design elements. It was originally constructed for the Oakes Manufacturing Company, then housed the Cantol Wax Company after 1920.

It was listed on the National Register of Historic Places in 1990. It is located in the Bloomington West Side Historic District.

References

Industrial buildings and structures on the National Register of Historic Places in Indiana
Commercial buildings on the National Register of Historic Places in Indiana
Industrial buildings completed in 1907
Neoclassical architecture in Indiana
Buildings and structures in Bloomington, Indiana
National Register of Historic Places in Monroe County, Indiana
Historic district contributing properties in Indiana